This article contains additional information about the band the Only Ones and the lead singer Peter Perrett.

Discography

Studio albums
The Only Ones (1978), UK #56
Even Serpents Shine (1979), UK #42
Baby's Got a Gun (1980), UK #37

Compilations & live albums
Special View (1979)
Remains (1984)
Alone in the Night (1986)
Live in London (UK Live) (1989)
The Peel Sessions Album (1989)
The Immortal Story (1992)
The Big Sleep (1993)
Live at the BBC (1995)
Hearts On Fire (Live At The Mean Fiddler - 1994) (2000)
Darkness & Light: The Complete BBC Recordings (2002)
Why Don't You Kill Yourself? (2004)
Another Girl, Another Planet: the Best of the Only Ones (2006)
Original Album Classics (2011)

Detailed discography
Vinyl albums

7-inch singles

Vinyl compilations

References

External links
Peter Perrett Sierra Braco Site

Only Ones, The
Punk rock group discographies